The Dutch Eerste Divisie in the 1977–78 season was contested by 19 teams. PEC Zwolle won the championship.

New entrants
Relegated from the 1976–77 Eredivisie
 FC Eindhoven
 De Graafschap

League standings

Promotion competition
In the promotion competition, four period winners (the best teams during each of the four quarters of the regular competition) played for promotion to the Eredivisie.

See also
 1977–78 Eredivisie
 1977–78 KNVB Cup

References

Netherlands - List of final tables (RSSSF)

Eerste Divisie seasons
2
Neth